Execrator may refer to:

Someone who casts a curse
"Execrator", a song by the Sword from the album Apocryphon